Concerto for Piano and Concerto in GA (pronounced Gis-Maj-As) is a piano concerto written by the Finnish jazz pianist Iiro Rantala and orchestrated by the Finnish violinist, composer and conductor Jaakko Kuusisto.

The concerto begins with the sound of the orchestra "tuning up".

Recordings 
Recorded by Tapiola Sinfonietta, conducted by Jaakko Kuusisto, piano by Iiro Rantala.

References 

Piano concertos
Finnish music